Aduri is a 2008 American thriller film directed by Riyadh Mahmood. Written by Mahmood and Fahid Hasan, the film stars Ariana Almajan and Kawan Karadaghi.

Produced by Washington DC filmmakers, and released May 16, 2008, Aduri presents the lives of two fugitives running from the FBI and correctly predicted the outcome of the 2008 United States presidential election in November. One of the news sequences in the film refers to President Barack Obama.

Production
The production of the film from screenwriting to premiere took about 3 years to complete.

Plot
Aduri Aman (Ariana Almajan), finds herself the target of federal agents, though she is herself employed by the FBI as an analyst. Unsuspecting that she may have knowledge of government secrets, she receives help and refuge from a stranger, Saif (Kawan Karadaghi). He seems overly eager to help. As the couple races through Washington D.C. suburbs, Aduri's own past catches up to her.

Various contemporary events are used as plot devices in Aduri. These include:

United States War on Terror
The 2004 Asian tsunami
The crude oil price hike from 2005 to 2008
The 2008 United States Presidential Elections

Cast
 Ariana Almajan as Aduri Aman
 Kawan Karadaghi as Saif Uddin
 Roger Payano as Agent Mason
 Christy Sullivan as Bebe
 Theodore Taylor as Mr. Wright
 Karl Bittner as Adrian Shepherd
 Patricia Berry as Aunt Julie 
 Gita M. McCarthy as Mrs. Aman 
 Wilson White as Mr. Aman 
 Karthik Srinivasan as Rakib Shah 
 Lauren Meley as News Anchor 
 Yaser Ahmed as News Anchor
 Gytis Kanchas as Angry Customer

Reception
When reviewed by DesiChutney, it was said, "In a sea of independent films, Aduri shines through with much promise of thrills, drama and a touch of comedy."

DVD release
Aduri was first released on DVD on February 5, 2009.

Soundtrack

The soundtrack to the film was released in 2008. Richard Ames composed approximately 50 minutes of original music for the soundtrack including the theme music. It consisted of various fusions of music from the east and west.

The song titled Conspiracy from the album Open Your Eyes, by Nesreen and M. Mehdi, is featured for the credits.

References

External links

  (film)
 Aduri. Official Website
 Aduri. Review at DesiChutney.com
 Aduri. Article on Passion For Cinema

2008 films
American thriller films
2008 thriller films
2000s English-language films
2000s American films